Gil's Guests is an album by American saxophonist Gil Mellé recorded in 1956 and released on the Prestige label.

Reception
The Allmusic review by Scott Yanow awarded the album 3 stars and stated "Baritonist Gil Melle's recordings are usually a bit unusual and this CD reissue is no exception... The charts are unpredictable and often dramatic, looking ahead toward a musical future that never occurred".

Track listing
All compositions by Gil Mellé
 "Soudan" - 6:21
 "Tomorrow" - 6:10
 "Block Island" - 4:57
 "Sixpence" - 5:52
"Still Life" - 8:10
 "Ghengis" - 3:46
 "Funk for Star People" - 6:37 Bonus track on CD reissue
 "Golden Age" - 6:46 Bonus track on CD reissue
 "Herbie" - 4:21 Bonus track on CD reissue
Recorded at Rudy Van Gelder Studio, Hackensack, New Jersey on August 10 (tracks 1-3) and August 24 (tracks 4-6), 1956 and January 18, 1957 (tracks 7-9).

Personnel
Gil Mellé - baritone saxophone
Joe Cinderella - guitar (tracks 1–6)
Vinnie Burke - bass (tracks 1–6)
Ed Thigpen - drums (tracks 1–6)
Hal McKusick - alto saxophone (tracks 1–6), flute (tracks 1–3)
Art Farmer - trumpet (tracks 1–3)
Kenny Dorham - trumpet (tracks 4–6)
Julius Watkins - french horn (tracks 1–3)
Don Butterfield - tuba (tracks 4–6)
Phil Woods - alto saxophone (tracks 7–9)
Seldon Powell - tenor saxophone (tracks 7–9)
Donald Byrd - trumpet (tracks 7–9)
Teddy Charles - vibraphone (tracks 7–9)
George Duvivier - bass (tracks 7–9)
Shadow Wilson - drums (tracks 7–9)

References

Prestige Records albums
Gil Mellé albums
1956 albums
Albums recorded at Van Gelder Studio